Willwerathia is a genus of synziphosurine, a paraphyletic group of horseshoe crab-like fossil chelicerate arthropods. Willwerathia known only by one species, Willwerathia laticeps, discovered in deposits of the Devonian period from the Klerf Formation, in the Rhenish Slate Mountains of Germany.

Morphology 

As a synziphosurine, Willwerathia is unusually large and so far the largest known synziphosurine, with largest carapace measured about 90mm in width. Prosoma of Willwerathia covered by a vaulted carapace with pointed genal spines, recurved (M-shaped) ophthalmic ridges and pairs of dorsal nodes. Tergites of the opisthosoma are either incomplete or disarticulated in available fossil materials, making it difficult to reveal the original number of opisthosomal segments. The opisthosoma of Willwerathia most likely compose of 10 segments, each expressed by a tergite that bore a median dorsal spine and a pair of tergopleurae (lateral extensions). The opisthosoma subdivided into a wider, most likely 7-segmented preabdomen and a narrower, 3-segmented postabdomen. tergite of the first opisthosomal segment is reduced in length while the remaining segments possess well-developed tergites with lateral nodes and posteriorly curved tergopleurae. The final segment terminated with a short, teardrop-shaped telson.

Paleoecology 
Willwerathia was most likely a bottom-dwelling predator. The marked articulation surfaces on each of the preabdominal segments suggest that Willwerathia capable to enroll itself in a way similar to Legrandella. The environment in which Wilwerathia lived in was likely an estuarine to deltaic one, and other animals like the largest eurypterid, Jaekelopterus, are known from the same formation.

Classification 
Willwerathia was originally though to be an eurypterid (sea scorpion), with additional fossils described in 1998 reveal its synziphosurine affinities. In the redescription done by Anderson et al. 1998, Willwerathia had been grouped under the synziphosurine family Weinberginidae alongside Weinbergina and Legrandella, a classification which is not supported by phylogenetic analysis. Willwerathia was regarded as part of the monophyletic Xiphosura sensu stricto (true horseshoe crab) by Lamsdell 2013, but further phylogenetic analysis repeatedly resolving it within a clade compose of Bunodids, Pseudoniscids and Dekatriatan (chasmataspidids, eurypterids and arachnids).

References 

Xiphosura
Synziphosurina
Devonian animals of Europe
Fossils of Germany
Fossil taxa described in 1969
Prehistoric arthropod genera